The Kumasi Central Market (also known as Kejetia Market) is an open-air market in the city of Kumasi. The Kejetia market is the largest single market in West Africa. It has over 10,000 stores and stalls.

Redevelopment of the market 
Due to the unsolicited development of uncontrolled humming of salespersons, uncountable fire outbreaks the government set out a well thought through redevelopment plan for the entire Kejetia market barrio. The redevelopment was undertaken in three major phases.

PHASE 1 
The first phase of the redevelopment started in 2015 and was valued at a cost of US$259,425,000 by the John Dramani Mahama government. The first phase of the project, included an ultra-modern market with 8,420 stores, a clinic, a police station, a masjid(mosque), a social and recreational center, I.C.T center, a post office, a fire post, banks, a butchery  and a day-care center. It was completed in late 2018.

PHASE 2 
Sod cutting for the phase two redevelopment of the Kumasi Central Market was done by Nana Addo Dankwah and Otumfuo Osei Tutu II, the Asantehene on 2 May 2019 for work to commence. The phase two is estimated to cost 248 million financed by Deutsche Bank of Germany with credit guarantee from UK Export finance to be completed within a time frame of 48 months.

When completed the market will have 6500 leased stores commercially, 5,400 stores closed, 800 kiosks, 50 restaurants, 40 livestock stores, 210 fish monger, butcher spaces and community facilities of 1,800 square meters. It is estimated to cover a total area of 172,197 square meters.

Market management
The huge human and vehicular traffic in and around the Kejetia market makes its management and law enforcement very difficult. Various methods of ensuring peace and order in the area are employed including the formation of a city guard group. The members of the group act as the Kejetia market's law enforcement authority. They handle basic traffic direction duties, anti-hawking activities, etc. However, they refer all cases that are beyond the jurisdiction to the Kejetia Police Personnel who have a station in the market. In 2010, the Kumasi Metropolitan Assembly through the market managers Freko FD Ltd installed CCTV cameras around the market, with the aim of strengthening security at the station. The move was expected to clamp down on vandals, who ply their trade in areas including the Kumasi Central market, PZ-Adum, Zoological gardens and its environs.

Fires

Fire outbreaks have historically been an issue of the Kejetia market. The market has had several outbreaks that have resulted in the destruction of stores, stalls and their wares. One outbreak occurred on 19 September 2001, when a blazing hail of fire gutted over 150 stores at the old Kejetia market. The cost of items destroyed was not readily assessed. The cause was attributed to illegal electrical connections performed by workers of a private developer.

Flooding 
By July 2022, the market experienced flooding six times due to burst pipes. This caused the destruction of some traders' goods.

Power 
As at June 28, 2022,The state-of-the market, was taken off the national grid over huge debts that have accrued for 14 months.

The Market has had power restored following a 20 percent payment of the GH¢5.2 million debt owed the Electricity Company of Ghana (ECG).

See also
 Economy of Ashanti

References

Kumasi
Populated places in Kumasi Metropolitan Assembly
Presidency of John Mahama
Retail markets in Ghana